Rob Snoek (born 1969) is a Canadian sports broadcaster and former athlete, who was a Canadian Screen Award nominee for Best Sports Play-by-Play at the 10th Canadian Screen Awards in 2022 for his work as a member of the CBC Sports broadcast team at the 2020 Summer Olympics.

A native of Orono, Ontario, Snoek's lower left leg was amputated at age one due to a congenital bone disease. He was a competitor in amputee athletics events, most notably at the 1992 Summer Paralympics, the 1996 Summer Paralympics and the 2000 Summer Paralympics. He was a bronze medalist at the paralympic edition of the World Athletics Championships in 1998.

After his retirement from competitive sport he moved into broadcasting as a play-by-play announcer for Ontario Hockey League games, first for the Oshawa Generals on CKDO, and later for Peterborough Petes games on CJMB-FM. He first joined the CBC's Olympic team in 2002, covering a variety of both main Olympic and Paralympic events.

He was inducted into the Canadian Disability Hall of Fame in 2017.

References

1969 births
Living people
20th-century Canadian people
21st-century Canadian people
Athletes (track and field) at the 1992 Summer Paralympics
Athletes (track and field) at the 1996 Summer Paralympics
Athletes (track and field) at the 2000 Summer Paralympics
Canadian amputees
Canadian television sportscasters
Canadian radio sportscasters
Paralympic track and field athletes of Canada
Sportspeople from Clarington
Canadian male sprinters
Canadian male long jumpers
Sprinters with limb difference
Long jumpers with limb difference
Paralympic sprinters
Paralympic long jumpers
Medalists at the World Para Athletics Championships
Canadian Disability Hall of Fame